Cry Pretty is the sixth studio album by American singer and songwriter Carrie Underwood. The album was released on September 14, 2018, as Underwood's first album with Capitol Records Nashville after signing a global deal with Universal Music Group at the start of 2017. The album marked the first co-producing effort by Underwood, who partnered with David Garcia for the record.

The album was met with mostly positive reviews from music critics, and debuted at number one on the US Billboard 200, making Underwood the first woman to hit the top of the Billboard 200 chart with four country albums. It also achieved the biggest sales week for a country album in more than three years, as well as the biggest sales week for a female artist in 2018. It also debuted at number one in Canada, number four in Australia and charted in several other markets.

The album was supported by four singles: "Cry Pretty", "Love Wins", “Southbound”, and "Drinking Alone". To further promote it, Underwood embarked on The Cry Pretty Tour 360, which started on May 1 and ended on October 31, 2019.

Background
On April 18, 2018, Underwood released a statement on the album, saying, "At this point in my career, I feel stronger and more creative than ever. I think you can hear that in this new album. It's emotional, it's soulful, it's real, and we also have some fun on there too. I hope everyone loves it as much as I have loved making it." Songwriter and producer David Garcia was selected to co-produce the album with Underwood. Additionally, Cry Pretty marks Underwood's first effort as producer. Although the making of the album had been going on for nearly a year before Underwood's fall and subsequent injuries in 2017, she wasn't able to record vocals for the songs until 2018, due to the damage to her mouth.

Underwood had reserved the track "The Bullet" for several album cycles, finally deciding to release it on the Cry Pretty album. She addressed the intent behind the song, calling it "timely but not political. It doesn’t matter what the opinions or feelings are, it just matters that something happened, and it’s about the people that are affected by it at the end of the day. I’m just glad I heard this song before anyone else did because I feel like it found its home with us.”

Underwood co-wrote the album's title track after having three miscarriages in two years, explaining that, "I would literally have these horrible things going on in my life and then have to go smile and do some interviews or photoshoots." She also addressed the more personal songs on the album, saying, “I feel like I’ve always been good about writing stories about other people and not so great writing about myself. I felt like through all the ups and downs of last year and the beginning of this year, it was...I had to. That’s just what was on my mind and on my heart.”

Underwood considers the album her most personal to date, saying, "I feel like this is the most me I've ever had in a project. This is the project that I've had my hands all over the most. It's just something I'm really proud of. I want people to find something that makes them feel something."

Promotion
Underwood performed the title track for the first time at the 53rd Academy of Country Music Awards on April 15, 2018, which was well received by critics. She returned to American Idol on May 13, 2018 to give the second televised performance of “Cry Pretty”. She also performed "Spinning Bottles" at the American Music Awards on October 9, 2018. She gave her first live performance of “Southbound” at the 54th Academy of Country Music Awards on April 7, 2019. Underwood performed “Low” from the album on the Late Show With Stephen Colbert. The album's fourth single, "Drinking Alone," had its debut televised performance at the 53rd Country Music Association awards on November 13, 2019.

Singles
"Cry Pretty", the first single from the album was released on April 11, 2018. It debuted at number 20 on the Billboard Country Airplay chart, and was the most added song to Country Radio that week. The song topped the Digital Songs chart, becoming Underwood's first song to do so and also debuted at number 48 on the Billboard Hot 100. It peaked at number nine on the Billboard Country Airplay chart and number five on the Hot Country Songs chart. "Love Wins" was released as the second single from the album on August 31, 2018, alongside a lyric video. It debuted at number 90 on the Scottish Singles Chart for the week of September 8, 2018, and number 30 on the US Hot Country Songs chart for the week of September 15, 2018. On September 7, 2018, "End Up with You" was released as a promotional single.

“Southbound” was released as the third single from the album on April 29, 2019. It reached number three on the Billboard Country Airplay chart and number 11 on the Hot Country Songs chart in the US. "Drinking Alone" was released as the fourth single from the album. It impacted country radio on November 4, 2019.

Tour
On August 8, 2018, Underwood announced The Cry Pretty Tour 360 in support of the album; the first date was May 1, 2019, in Greensboro, North Carolina and the tour concluded on October 31 in Detroit, Michigan, playing 54 shows. Runaway June and Maddie & Tae were the supporting acts of the tour.

Critical reception

Cry Pretty received mostly positive reviews from critics. On Metacritic, which assigns a normalized rating out of 100 to reviews from mainstream publications, the album has an average score of 69, based on eleven reviews. Giving a rating of three and a half stars out of five, Rolling Stone called Cry Pretty a "modern country album pivoting into pop and R&B without going full Taylor, while also showing the kind of character more mega-stars should aspire to". The songwriting was referred to as "grade-A" and Underwood's voice was deemed "mighty" and "selling even the lesser [songs]". The review also praised Underwood for raising the topic of gun violence in "The Bullet" and "Love Wins", noting that "if Underwood isn't going there, she's at least got the balls to engage the subject in the mainstream, where the conversation needs to happen — while her male peers, no doubt worried about their market share, seem scared to make a peep". Additionally, the review draws favourable similarities to the music of Adele, Kate Bush, Beyoncé, Brad Paisley and Alison Krauss but highlights Sam Hunt, explaining that the "architecture [of the album] is R&B at its core". Markos Papadatos of the Digital Journal praised the album stating "the control Underwood maintains over her voice throughout the album is impeccable. Overall, Carrie Underwood excels on this album as a singer, songwriter, and producer. Cry Pretty is a superb studio effort, and it garners an A rating." The Diamondback reviewed the album favorably, writing "poised and mature, her sixth studio album effortlessly differentiates itself through the masterful lyricism and savvy falsettos that trademark Underwood's undeniable talent, even over a decade after her American Idol win. The organic sense of vulnerability conveyed throughout the entire album leaves the listener with the impression of having just sat down and talked for hours with Underwood herself." The review concluded with the statement "Underwood proves on Cry Pretty that she has strategically maintained her stronghold of country regality, as this album portrays her dynamic evolution not only as a musician, but as a person as well." The Los Angeles Times gave a mixed review, saying, "The singer, no surprise, sets off all kinds of vocal fireworks. But as the painfully familiar images in “Southbound” demonstrate — another pontoon boat? — the songs on “Cry Pretty” (most of which Underwood co-wrote) cast these emotions and experiences in such generalized terms that it’s hard to come away with a clear sense of a human in the world."

Accolades
At the 2019 Billboard Music Awards, the album received a nomination for Top Country Album. At the 53rd Annual Country Music Association Awards, the album received a nomination for Country Music Association Award for Album of the Year. At the  47th Annual American Music Awards the album won the award for Favorite Country Album, making Underwood the only artist to receive that award for every album they have released.

Commercial performance
In the United States, Cry Pretty debuted on top of the Billboard 200 with 266,000 album-equivalent units, including 251,000 pure album sales, giving Underwood her fourth number-one album, and making her the first woman to have four number-one country albums on the chart. It is the largest sales week for a country album since Luke Bryan's Kill the Lights in 2015, and the biggest sales week for a female artist in 2018. It also debuted atop the Top Country Albums chart, becoming her seventh consecutive number one album on that chart. The debut of Cry Pretty at number one on the Billboard 200 prompted Underwood to rise from number sixty-one to the top of Billboard Artist 100. It made her the first female country artist to top that chart. It was the seventh best-selling album of 2018 in the United States, with 401,000 copies sold that year. It has sold 534,000 physical copies and a total of 870,000 copies including streaming in the United States as of January 2020. Cry Pretty was certified Gold by the RIAA on October 23, 2018, and Platinum on February 12, 2020.

The album also debuted at number one on the Canadian Albums Chart with 28,000 album-equivalent units, giving Underwood her third number-one album in the country. Cry Pretty opened at number four on the Australian ARIA Albums Chart, becoming her third top five album there, while also debuting at number one on the country component chart. It also debuted at number 12 in Scotland and number sixteen on the UK Albums Chart—becoming her third top twenty album in the region.

The album's four singles, "Cry Pretty," "Love Wins," "Southbound," and "Drinking Alone" have all been certified gold or platinum by the RIAA as of August 2021, with streaming included.

Track listing
Track listing and credits adapted from Rolling Stone and the iTunes Store. All songs produced by Carrie Underwood and David Garcia, except "The Champion", produced by Jim Jonsin.

Personnel 
 Carrie Underwood – lead vocals, backing vocals (1, 2, 4–8, 10, 11, 12), percussion (11)
 Dave Cohen – keyboards (1, 2, 5, 6, 7, 9, 10, 12), programming (6, 7, 10, 12)
 Charlie Judge – keyboards (3, 8), programming (3)
 Jason Evigan – keyboards (6), programming (6)
 Fred Williams – keyboards (6, 12), programming (6, 12)
 Sarah Emily Berrios – programming (8)
 Will Weatherly – keyboards (11), programming (11)
 Robert Dante – keyboards (13), acoustic piano (13)
 David Garcia – acoustic guitar (1, 7, 10), electric guitar (3, 5, 8, 11), keyboards (3-12), programming (3-8, 10, 11, 12), drums (4), backing vocals (4), percussion (11)
 Ilya Toshinsky – acoustic guitar (1, 2, 5, 11, 12), bouzouki (2), banjo (5), dobro (5), electric guitar (5), mandolin (5, 10, 12), resonator guitar (6)
 Dan Dugmore – pedal steel guitar (1, 3, 6, 8-12)
 Tom Bukovac – electric guitar (1,2, 5, 7, 10)
 Rob McNelley – electric guitar (1,2, 3, 5–8, 10, 11, 12)
 Steve Hinson – pedal steel guitar (2)
 Hillary Lindsey – acoustic guitar (3), backing vocals (4, 8, 11)
 Bryan Sutton – acoustic guitar (3, 4, 8)
 Danny Rader – acoustic guitar (3, 4, 6, 8, 10), electric guitar (3, 4, 8, 12), dobro (6, 7)
 Michael Burman – guitar (13)
 Bones Owens – guitar (13)
 Ben Haggard – acoustic guitar (13)
 Jimmie Lee Sloas – bass guitar (1-8, 10, 12)
 Chris McHugh – drums (1, 2, 3, 5–8, 10, 12), percussion (1, 11)
 Nir Z. – drums (11)
 Austin Hoke – cello (9)
 Carole Rabinowitz – cello (10, 12)
 Kris Wilkinson – viola (10, 12)
 Will Hoge - harmonica (5)
 David Angell – violin (10, 12)
 David Davidson – violin (10, 12), strings arrangements (10, 12)
 Holly Williams – backing vocals (2)
 Ivey Childers – backing vocals (5)
Jenni Fairbanks – backing vocals (5)
 Amanda Luftburrow – backing vocals (5)
 Will Hoge - backing vocals (6)
 Josh Miller – backing vocals (5)
 Dave Barnes – backing vocals (10)
 Perry Coleman – backing vocals (10)
 Vicki Hampton – backing vocals (10)
 Brett James – backing vocals (10)
 Wendy Moten – backing vocals (10)
 Ludacris – featured rapper (13)
 The McCrary Sisters – backing vocals (13)

Production 
 David Garcia – producer (1-12), editing (1-12)
 Carrie Underwood – producer (1-12), creative director 
 Jim Jonsin – producer (13), mixing (13)
 John Ditty – engineer (1-12), editing (1-12)
 John Hanes – engineer (1-12)
 Kam Luchterhand – engineer (1-12)
 Doug Johnson – mixing (1-12)
 Chris Lord-Alge – mixing (1, 3, 8)
 Mark Endert – mixing (2, 12)
 Serban Ghenea – mixing (4-7, 9, 10, 11)
 Niko Marzouca – engineer (13), mixing (13)
 Rob Marks – mixing (13)
 Adam Chagnon – musical assistance
 Nik Karpen – musical assistance
 Nate Lowery – production manager
 Bethany Newman – art direction 
 Joshua Sage Newman – art direction 
 Parker Foote – design
 Randee St. Nicholas – photography
 Ann Edelbulte – manager

Charts

Weekly charts

Year-end charts

Certifications

References

2018 albums 
Albums produced by Jim Jonsin
Capitol Records Nashville albums
Carrie Underwood albums